The Voice of Passion is a 1913 Swedish silent drama film directed by Victor Sjöström.

Cast
 Greta Almroth - Ruth
 John Ekman
 Richard Lund - Lander
 Victor Sjöström - Daniel Barkner
 Ragna Wettergreen - Louise Barkner

References

External links

1913 films
1910s Swedish-language films
Swedish black-and-white films
1913 drama films
Swedish silent feature films
Films directed by Victor Sjöström
Swedish drama films
Silent drama films